Serhiy Volodymyrovych Lapa (born 19 August 1992 in Kremenchuk, Poltava Oblast) is a Ukrainian football midfielder currently playing for Ukrainian Second League club Hirnyk-Sport.

Club history
Serhiy Lapa began his football career in Kremin-92 in Kremenchuk. He signed with FC Kremin Kremenchuk during 2009 winter transfer window.

International career

Ukraine youth
Serhiy Lapa made his Ukraine Under-16s debut on 4 April 2008 in a friendly against Turkey Under-16.

Career statistics

References

External links
  https://web.archive.org/web/20091204135412/http://fckremin.com.ua/club/players/lapa.htm Profile] – Official Kremin site
  FC Kremin Kremenchuk Squad on the PFL website
  Profile on the FFU website

1992 births
Living people
FC Kremin Kremenchuk players
FC Hirnyk-Sport Horishni Plavni players
Ukrainian footballers
Association football midfielders
People from Kremenchuk
Sportspeople from Poltava Oblast
21st-century Ukrainian people